Marcos Antônio Silva Santos (born 13 June 2000) is a Brazilian professional footballer who plays as a midfielder for Serie A club Lazio.

Club career

Athletico Paranaense
Born in Poções, Antônio joined the youth setup of Athletico Paranaense in 2014.

Estoril
On 7 July 2018, he moved to the Portuguese club Estoril and signed a professional contract. On 30 September, he made his debut in a 1–0 win against CF Vasco da Gama Vidigueira, in Taça de Portugal.

Shakhtar Donetsk
On 19 February 2019, Antônio joined the Ukrainian club Shakhtar Donetsk. On March 13, 2020, he scored his first goal in Europa League in the 2-1 Shakhtar away victory against VfL Wolfsburg.

Lazio
On 20 June 2022, Antônio signed for Lazio.

International career
Antônio played for the under-17 team at the 2017 South American U-17 Championship.p He also represented the side at the 2017 FIFA U-17 World Cup held in India, and scored a goal against Honduras in the Round of 16.

Career statistics

Club

Honours
Athletico Paranaense
 Campeonato Paranaense: 2018

Shakhtar Donetsk
 Ukrainian Premier League: 2018–19, 2019–20
 Ukrainian Cup: 2018–19
 Ukrainian Super Cup: 2021

Brazil U17
 South American U-17 Championship: 2017
Indidivual
South American Youth Championship Team of the Tournament: 2019

References

External links

 
 

2000 births
Living people
Brazilian footballers
Association football midfielders
G.D. Estoril Praia
FC Shakhtar Donetsk players
S.S. Lazio players
Liga Portugal 2 players
Ukrainian Premier League players
Brazil youth international footballers
Brazilian expatriate footballers
Brazilian expatriate sportspeople in Portugal
Brazilian expatriate sportspeople in Ukraine
Brazilian expatriate sportspeople in Italy
Expatriate footballers in Portugal
Expatriate footballers in Ukraine
Expatriate footballers in Italy